The 1893 Sea Islands hurricane was a deadly major hurricane that struck the Sea Islands which was near Savannah, Georgia on August 27, 1893. It was the 7th deadliest hurricane in the United States history, and was one of the three deadly hurricanes during the 1893 Atlantic hurricane season; the storm killed an estimated 1,000–2,000 people, mostly from storm surge. This is also the storm that made United States Life-Saving Service Keeper Dunbar Davis famous, by rescuing 4 ships.

Meteorological history

Modern analysis of historical records has allowed the history of this storm to be pieced together, although the analysis is only an estimate since few accurate meteorological records were taken.

On August 15, 1893, a tropical storm formed east of Cape Verde. It likely passed directly through the islands on the 16th, leaving their vicinity during the evening of the 17th. It became a hurricane on the 19th, while crossing the Atlantic between the Cape Verde Islands and the Lesser Antilles. The hurricane continued to strengthen, attaining Category 3 status on August 22 while located northeast of the Lesser Antilles. By the evening of the 25th, the storm was approaching the Bahamas. During the approach it began to deviate from its westerly course and arc west-northwest. It is believed that the first effects of the storm were beginning to be felt in the Sea Islands area, with the winds steadily increasing during the night of the 25th.

Some of the inhabitants anticipated the storm and left the islands as quickly as possible. The conditions soon rapidly deteriorated on the island and the hurricane passed over sometime on the 26th. By now the hurricane was turning more and more towards the north. It moved parallel to the coast for about one hundred miles before making landfall.

Landfall occurred near Savannah, Georgia, on August 27. This would have made the hurricane most likely stronger than a Category 3 storm on the Saffir–Simpson Hurricane Scale. The hurricane passed north over South Carolina on August 28 and moved up the U.S. East Coast before becoming extratropical over Atlantic Canada. The storm likely intensified to a Category 4, or 5, but there are no reports of this occurring.

Impact

The hurricane carried with it a heavy storm surge (according to Clara Barton, although the modern NOAA SLOSH model calculates that some areas may have been inundated up to 30 feet), which caused great destruction along the coastline and offshore Sea Islands in Georgia and South Carolina. An estimated 1,000 to 2,000 people were killed (mostly by drowning), putting it on-par with 2005's Hurricane Katrina as the sixth-deadliest hurricane in US history. St. Helena was estimated to have 6,000 African-Americans living there while 2,000 were women. The majority of the African-Americans owned land there and some rented. A lot of structures in that area were not elevated higher than 2 feet; therefore, they were covered by the first waves that went above the normal water mark.

Although the hurricane was devastating, the American Red Cross did not arrive until October 1, possibly because of ongoing efforts following another hurricane that hit South Carolina in June. After the Red Cross arrived, a warehouse of clothing and food was started at Beaufort, South Carolina, to provide services to the affected. Relief efforts were impeded by a second Category 3 hurricane that struck just north of the area, near Charleston, South Carolina, on October 13. During a massive 10-month relief campaign, success was declared, with the Sea Islands population living in decent houses producing their own food again.

Damage was reported as far north as Maine. Some areas, particularly New York City and Long Island, were already reeling from what later came to be known as the 1893 New York hurricane that had struck the region just days before, on August 24, and were damaged anew by this storm. "Immense" damage was reported to shade trees and telegraph and telephone wires in Washington.  In Annapolis, Maryland "hardly a tree was left standing" and Baltimore reported the worst flooding since 1868. In New Jersey, damage was "heavy" in the New Brunswick area, and many trees were downed and roofs were blown off in Trenton. Damage was heavy all along the New Jersey coast and breakers were described as the biggest ever witnessed.  Railroad tracks were under four feet of water between Bay Head and Berkley. In New York, several people died in The Rockaways, and a number of people were killed at points along the Hudson River when tow boats were destroyed. Crops were heavily damaged in Pennsylvania and upstate New York. Boats were wrecked and sunk in the Dunkirk area. In Brooklyn, where 13 houses under construction were destroyed, damage was "severe" and Gravesend Bay was "littered with the wrecks of small yachts and boats." In Coney Island, roofs were lifted off big buildings and carried for blocks. Waves topped the seawall by 15 feet at Battery Park. Damage was heavy at resorts on Long Island and it was the worst storm on the New England coast in 20 years.

See also

 List of tropical cyclones
 List of Atlantic hurricanes
 List of New England hurricanes
 1893 Cheniere Caminada Hurricane
 1893 Charleston Hurricane
Hurricane Matthew
 Dunbar Davis
 List of Florida hurricanes
 List of North Carolina hurricanes

Notes

References

Further reading

Satterthwait, Elisabeth Carpenter (1898). A Son of the Carolinas, A story of the Hurricane upon The Sea Islands. Philadelphia, Pa.: Henry Altemus. 273 pp.  – a historical-fiction account from the perspective of the people affected.

External links
 Cyclone of 1893 
 NOAA Hurricane Track
 August 27 in Georgia history
 Beaufort County Public Library hurricane history
 North Florida & Coastal Georgia hurricanes, 1565–1899
 UNISYS 1893 hurricane tracks
 

1893 Sea Islands
1893 Sea Islands
 (1893)
1893 Sea Islands
Sea Islands Hurricane, 1893
Hurricanes in New York (state)
Hurricanes in New Jersey
Hurricanes in Maryland